Zelle Abbey is a former Augustinian monastery of canons regular in the village of Zelle in the borough of Aue in the German federal state of Saxony. It served as a Lutheran church from 1879 to 1914.

Sources 
Ralf Petermann: Wertvolle Befunde am Klösterlein Zelle, Aue, 1996
Günter Kavacs und Norbert Oelsner: Die Kirche des "Klösterlein Zelle" zu Aue. Baugeschichtliche Beobachtungen und historische Einordnung. In: Denkmalpflege in Sachsen. Mitteilungen des Landesamtes für Denkmalpflege Sachsen 2002,  S. 104–121.
Georg Dehio: Handbuch der Deutschen Kunstdenkmäler Sachsen: II. Regierungsbezirke Leipzig und Chemnitz. Deutscher Kunstverlag, München 1998, S. 880f.

References

External links 
Website of the Society for the Preservation of Zelle Abbey (Fördervereins Klösterlein Zelle e. V.)
 "Das Fräulein auf der Mulde bei Klösterlein Zelle" - from the Erzgebirgischen Sagenbuch; p. 53 ff

12th-century churches in Germany
Aue
Lutheran churches in Saxony
Monasteries in Saxony
Augustinian monasteries in Germany
Buildings and structures in Erzgebirgskreis